The Lake Pedder earthworm (Hypolimnus pedderensis) is an extinct earthworm species in the family Megascolecidae. Its genus Hypolimnus is monotypic.

It was endemic to the Lake Pedder area in Tasmania, Australia, prior to its flooding in 1972 for a hydro-electric power scheme.

It is only known from a specimen collected from a Lake Pedder beach in 1971. A 1996 survey failed to find it and it is presumed extinct.

The Lake Pedder earthworm mainly fed on microbes or algae on sand particles. Their feeding habits were seen to have a considerable impact on the banks of the lake, as the particles they consumed were deposited on the surface of the ground in the form of castings. As these castings were exposed to air, the soil was aerated, improving both the drainage and water holding capacity of the soil.

References

Megascolecidae
Extinct animals of Australia
Lake Pedder
Endemic fauna of Australia
Taxonomy articles created by Polbot
Animals described in 1974